La Forêt-du-Parc is a commune in the Eure department in the Normandy region in northern France.

Population

See also
Communes of the Eure department

References

Communes of Eure